Webster University Ghana Campus is a private university in Accra, Ghana. It is the Ghanaian campus of Webster University, based in St. Louis, Missouri, United States. As a member of the Webster University Network, Webster Ghana students have the option of studying abroad at any of Webster's campuses located in eight countries. Webster has campuses in Austria, China, Vienna, Switzerland, Thailand, the Netherlands, the United Kingdom and the USA.

History and parent institution
Founded in 2013, Webster Ghana is the Webster University's first campus in Africa.

The parent institution, Webster University, operates as an independent, non-denominational university with more than 100 campus locations around the world, including Webster University Thailand, Webster University Vienna, Regent's American College London, Webster University Leiden, Webster University Ghana, Webster University Geneva, and Webster University St. Louis. Webster University offers undergraduate and graduate programs in a wide array of disciplines, including the liberal arts, fine and performing arts, teacher education, business, management and media communications.  Not all of these degrees are offered at all campuses

Academics
Webster University Ghana Campus is accredited by the U.S. Higher Learning Commission (via the accreditation of Webster University in the state of Missouri)  and by the Ghanaian National Accreditation Board.

Undergraduate programs

Webster University Ghana offers undergraduate degrees in: 
 BA International Relations 
 BA Management 
 BA Media Communications 
 BS Computer Science
 BS Finance
 BA Psychology

Graduate programs
Webster University Ghana graduate programs are: 
 MA International Relation 
 Master of Business Administration.

Global perspective

Webster Worldwide
As a member of the Webster University Network, Webster Ghana students have the option of studying abroad at any of Webster's campuses located in eight different countries. Webster has campuses in Austria, China, Vienna, Switzerland, Thailand, the Netherlands, the United Kingdom and the USA.

As one university system, the international connections Webster has worldwide provides an easy path for their students to study abroad. Students who choose to study abroad have the security of all courses transferring, plus the benefit of choosing a flexible length of stay of between eight weeks to over a year within the same university.

International locations
In addition to Webster Ghana, Webster University maintains 11 campus locations around the world, including:

 Bangkok, Thailand - Webster University Thailand
 Cha-am/Hua Hin, Thailand - Webster University Thailand
 Chengdu, China - Webster China
 Geneva, Switzerland - Webster University Geneva Website 
 Leiden, Netherlands - Webster Leiden Website 
 London, England - Webster Graduate School at Regent's College
 Shanghai, China - Webster China
 Shenzhen, China - Webster China
 Vienna, Austria - Webster University Vienna
 Tashkent, Uzbekistan - Webster University Tashkent. www.webster.uz
 Astana, Kazakhstan - Webster University Astana

See also

 Education in Ghana
 List of universities in Ghana
 List of Webster University alumni
 List of Webster University campus locations

External links
 , the official website of Webster University Ghana Campus

References

2013 establishments in Ghana
Educational institutions established in 2013
Private universities and colleges
Satellite campuses
Education in Accra
Universities in Ghana
Webster University